Solidarité Scolaire is a football club in Guadeloupe, based in the town of Baie-Mahault. They originally come from Pointe-à-Pitre.

They play in Guadeloupe's second division, the Promotion d'Honneur Régionale.

Current squad

Achievements
Guadeloupe Championnat National: 6
 1987–88, 1989–90, 1990–91, 1991–92, 1992–93, 2021–22

Coupe de Guadeloupe: 5
 1963, 1973, 1986, 1992, 1993

Performance in CONCACAF competitions
CONCACAF Champions Cup: 4 appearances
1989 – First round (Caribbean Zone) – Lost against  Réveil- Sportif 2–4 on aggregate
1991 – First round (Caribbean Zone) – Lost against  US Marinoise 1–3 on aggregate
1992 – Second round (Caribbean Zone) – Lost against  Aiglon du Lamentin 1–2 on aggregate
1994 – First Round (Caribbean) – Lost against  Sithoc 3–4 on aggregate

External links
 Tour des clubs 2008–2009 – Gwadafoot 
 Club info – French Football Federation 

Football clubs in Guadeloupe